Rush Soccer is an international soccer organization that was founded in Denver, Colorado and is headquartered in New York. Rush Soccer partners with over 80 youth and professional clubs across the world.

History 
Rush Soccer was founded in April 1997 in Denver, Colorado. The Colorado Rush, the first domestic Rush club, has won over 12 National Championships, and 1 World Youth Tournament since the inaugural season began in 1997. The first partnered club was Virginia Rush in 2002 in Virginia Beach, Virginia.

In 2009, Rush Soccer began to expand internationally after partnering with a small district in South Africa called Nkomazi. Since then, Rush has formed partnerships with clubs in Africa, South America, Central America Europe and Asia. Rush is represented in 48 states of the US and in over 30 countries.

Founder 
Tim Schulz is the founder of Rush Soccer.

Notable players 
 Christian Pulisic
 Lindsey Horan
 Cole Bassett
 Collen Warner
 Paolo DelPiccolo
 Kekuta Manneh

References 

Soccer organizations in the United States
Youth soccer in the United States